Mărăşti may refer to:

Places in Romania
Mărăști, Cluj-Napoca, a district of Cluj-Napoca
Mărăşti, a village in Răcoasa Commune, Vrancea County
The location of the Battle of Mărăşti
Mărăști, a village in Filipeni Commune, Bacău County

Other uses
Mărăşti River, a tributary of the river Șușița in Romania
NMS Mărăști, a World War II Romanian destroyer

See also 
 Mărășești (disambiguation)
 Maraština, a white grape variety